This is a list of Scottish football transfers featuring at least one 2013–14 Scottish Premiership club or one 2013–14 Scottish Championship club which were completed after the end of the 2012–13 season and before the end of the 2013 summer transfer window.

May 2013 – August 2013

See also
 List of Scottish football transfers winter 2012–13
 List of Scottish football transfers winter 2013–14

References

Transfers
Scottish
2013 in Scottish sport
2013 summer